The Speaker of the House of Representatives is the highest-ranking presiding officer of the Dewan Rakyat, the lower house of the Parliament of Malaysia. He is responsible for convening sessions of the Dewan Rakyat, organising debates, and examining the admissibility of petitions, bills, and amendments. In the absence of the Speaker, one of his deputies will take his place.

The current speaker is Johari Abdul, who was elected on 19 December 2022 for the 15th Malaysian Parliament.

Functions
The Speaker determines when a sitting of the House should open and close, and may suspend the sitting for a brief period of time if necessary. He is also in charge of ensuring the Constitution and Standing Orders of the House are given due respect; disciplining members of the House; determining who shall have the floor during a sitting; calling a vote; and checking for a quorum when the House meets. He only participates in a vote when there is a tie. The Speaker also has powers some allege to be excessive, such as imposing limits on the posing of supplementary questions during Question Time — an important procedure for the legislature to examine the government's actions — the power to restrict the tabling of questions for Question Time, and the power to amend written copies of speeches made by members of the House before they are given verbally.

Speaker election
The Speaker is elected to a term that lasts for the length of the term of the Dewan Rakyat that elected him. His term ends when the House is dissolved and a general election is called. He is elected when the House meets for the first time after a general election by the members of the House, who are called MPs. Any MP is qualified to be the Speaker of the House, but non-MPs who meet the same qualifications required to be an MP are also eligible for election as Speaker. A candidate for Speaker must be nominated and seconded by at least two MPs other than himself. This nomination process must be conducted at least 14 days before the election of the Speaker. If only one candidate meets these conditions, he is automatically elected Speaker; otherwise, voting by secret ballot is conducted, with the winner decided by a simple majority. Two deputy Speakers are elected in a similar manner.

The Secretary (Malay:Setiausaha) of the House presides over the voting.

List of speakers of the Dewan Rakyat

Election results

List of deputy speakers of the Dewan Rakyat
The Dewan Rakyat (House of Representatives) shall be from time to time elect two deputy speakers from among members of the House. During any vacancy in the office of Speaker or during any absence of the Speaker from any sitting, one of the Deputy Speakers or, if both the Deputy Speakers are absent or if both their offices are vacant, such other member as may be determined by the rules of procedure of the House, shall act as Speaker.

Election results

See also
Dewan Rakyat
Parliament of Malaysia
President of the Dewan Negara

Notes and references

 
Parliament of Malaysia